In coordination chemistry, the Das cubane is a transition metal carboxylate complex with the formula [CoO(OAc)py]4 where OAc is acetate and py is pyridine.  The compound is named after Birinchi K. Das, who led the team that discovered the cluster.  The compound features of Co4O4 core.  Each Co(III) center is low-spin and has octahedral geometry. The compound is prepared by mixing a cobalt(II) salt with acetate and pyridine followed by oxidation with hydrogen peroxide.

References

 Cobalt complexes